The African Human Rights Moot Court Competition is an international moot court competition with a special focus on human rights in Africa. The competition is organised by the Centre for Human Rights, based at the University of Pretoria Faculty of Law in South Africa. Each year, the competition is hosted by  a Law Faculty from a different African country. Since its inception in 1992, the competition has had 845 participant teams originating from 125 universities from 45 African countries.

The competition is tri-lingual and preliminary rounds are argued in English, French and Portuguese. Students argue a hypothetical human rights case and base their arguments on the African Charter on Human and Peoples' Rights.  The final round is argued by two teams made up of the best three Anglophone teams, two Francophone teams and one Lusophone team. The final round is judged by prominent African and international jurists.

Recognition

The African Human Rights Moot Court has been described as the largest gathering of law students and lecturers on the African continent. The Centre for Human Rights was awarded the UNESCO Prize for Human Rights Education in 2006 and the African Human Rights Moot Court received a special mention as it is one of the flagship programmes of the Centre.

Historical overview

See also

Moot court
Centre for Human Rights
World Human Rights Moot Court Competition
 South African National Schools Moot Court Competition

References

External links
Official website of the competition
Article: Top UN award for SA rights centre

Moot court competitions
Human rights organisations based in South Africa
Education in Africa
University of Pretoria